Jimmy Saddler-McQueen (born August 4, 1987) is a defensive tackle who is currently a free agent. He was signed by the Chicago Bears as an undrafted free agent in 2010 and was signed to the Detroit Lions practice squad on October 3, 2012.

Saddler-McQueen attended Forest Brook High School in Houston, Texas, and played college football at Texas A&M-Kingsville.

In addition to the Bears and the Lions, he has been a member of the St. Louis Rams, Dallas Cowboys, Tampa Bay Storm, and Jacksonville Sharks.

Professional career

Pre-draft measurables

Chicago Bears
After going undrafted in the 2010 NFL Draft, Saddler-McQueen signed with the Chicago Bears as an undrafted free agent on April 25, 2010. He was waived on July 21, 2010.

First stint with Cowboys
Saddler-McQueen signed with the Dallas Cowboys on July 29, 2010. After training camp and the preseason, the Cowboys cut him during the roster cuts.

First stint with Rams
Saddler-McQueen was signed to Rams practice squad on October 4, 2010. On October 28, 2010, he was deleted from the Rams' practice squad and then added again on October 28, 2010.

Second stint with Cowboys
The Cowboys re-signed Saddler-McQueen on November 10, 2010.  He played in his first career game on November 14, 2010, against the New York Giants. He was later cut on November 29, 2010.

Second stint with Rams
The Rams again signed Saddler-McQueen to their practice squad on December 14, 2010.  He was then signed to a future contract by the St. Louis Rams on January 4, 2011.

Third stint with Cowboys
On August 1, 2011, Dallas claimed Saddler-McQueen off waivers.

Tampa Bay Storm
Saddler-McQueen played for the Storm in 2012, appearing in four games. He recorded 5 tackles and a pass breakup in Week 4 against the Jacksonville Sharks.

Jacksonville Sharks
On May 17, 2012, Saddler-McQueen was signed by the Sharks.

Houston Texans
The Houston Texans signed Saddler-McQueen on August 4, 2012.

Detroit Lions
The Detroit Lions signed Saddler-McQueen to their practice squad on October 3, 2012. The Lions waived former Alabama standout Lorenzo Washington to make room on the roster.

References

External links
St. Louis Rams bio
ESPN.com bio
Arena Football bio
ArenaFan bio

1987 births
Living people
People from Houston
Sportspeople from Texas
Players of American football from Texas
American football defensive tackles
Texas A&M–Kingsville Javelinas football players
Dallas Cowboys players
St. Louis Rams players
Tampa Bay Storm players
Jacksonville Sharks players
Orlando Predators players
Houston Texans players
Detroit Lions players
Forest Brook High School alumni